Serge Panine may refer to: 

 Serge Panine (novel), a work by the French writer Georges Ohnet
 Serge Panine (1913 film), a French silent film
 Serge Panine (1915 film), an American silent film
 Serge Panine (1922 film), an Austrian-French silent film
 Serge Panine (1939 film), a French film